The Men's 100m T53 had its competition held on September 16 with the first round at 11:51 and the final at 17:48.

Medalists

Results

Footnotes

Round 1 - Heat 1
Round 1 - Heat 2
Final

Athletics at the 2008 Summer Paralympics